Digby—Annapolis—Kings was a federal electoral district in the province of Nova Scotia, Canada, that was represented in the House of Commons of Canada from 1935 to 1949, and from 1953 to 1968.

This riding was created in 1933 from parts of Digby—Annapolis and Hants—Kings ridings. It consisted of the counties of Kings and Annapolis and the county of Digby excluding the municipality of Clare. The district was abolished in 1947 when it was redistributed between Annapolis—Kings and Digby—Yarmouth ridings.

The district was created again in 1952 from Annapolis—Kings and Digby—Yarmouth. It consisted of the counties of Kings and Annapolis and the county of Digby excluding the Municipality of Clare. It was abolished in 1966 when it was redistributed between Annapolis Valley and South Western Nova ridings.

Members of Parliament

This riding elected the following Members of Parliament:

Election results

1935–1949

1953–1968

See also 

 List of Canadian federal electoral districts
 Past Canadian electoral districts

External links 
 Riding history for Digby—Annapolis—Kings (1933–1947) from the Library of Parliament
 Riding history for Digby—Annapolis—Kings (1952–1966) from the Library of Parliament

Former federal electoral districts of Nova Scotia